Dowling is a ghost town in Haakon County, in the U.S. state of South Dakota.

Dowling was laid out in 1907.

References

Ghost towns in South Dakota
Geography of Haakon County, South Dakota